The Pennsylvania State Athletic Conference Football Championship Game or PSAC Football Championship is a yearly American football championship game between two Pennsylvania State Athletic Conference teams (East and West division) to decide the champions of the PSAC.

The championship games date back to 1960 where West Chester was the first to win, however champions had been selected by sportswriters and the Saylor Point System since 1934. Champions have been decided every year since then, except for three years during World War II when PSAC did not compete.

List of Winners

Prior to Championship Game

In 1943, 1944, 1945 no teams competed in PSAC play due to WWII.

Championship Game

Winners by team
Schools that no longer play PSAC football are in italics.

Notes
 One other PSAC member, Pitt–Johnstown, does not sponsor football.
 Among current PSAC members that sponsor football, three have never won the conference title—Gannon, Seton Hill, and Shepherd. All are among the conference's newer members; Gannon joined in 2008, Seton Hill in 2013, and Shepherd in 2019.

References

 
Annual events in Pennsylvania
1960 establishments in Pennsylvania
Recurring sporting events established in 1960